A list of films produced in Egypt in 1960. For an A-Z list of films currently on Wikipedia, see :Category:Egyptian films.

External links
 Egyptian films of 1960 at the Internet Movie Database
 Egyptian films of 1960 elCinema.com

Lists of Egyptian films by year
1960 in Egypt
Lists of 1960 films by country or language